The Rental is a 2020 American horror film co-written, produced and directed by Dave Franco, in his feature directorial debut. Franco co-wrote the screenplay with Joe Swanberg from a story by Franco, Swanberg, and Mike Demski. It stars Dan Stevens, Alison Brie, Sheila Vand, Jeremy Allen White, and Toby Huss, and follows two couples who begin to suspect they are being watched in the house they rented.

The film was released on video-on-demand and in select theaters in the United States on July 24, 2020, by IFC Films. It received generally positive reviews from critics, and became the second film to ever top video-on-demand (VOD) charts and the box office in the same weekend.

Plot
Charlie, his wife Michelle, his brother Josh, and Josh's girlfriend/Charlie's coworker Mina rent a remote house on the Oregon Coast for a weekend getaway. On their arrival at the property, they meet the house's caretaker Taylor, who acts oddly and makes racist remarks toward Mina. After they have settled in, Mina, Josh, and Charlie take MDMA (ecstasy) while Michelle goes to bed. Josh later passes out on the couch, and Mina and Charlie end up kissing in the hot tub and having sex in the shower.

The next morning, Charlie and Mina agree to forget what happened between them and not tell their respective partners. While taking a shower, Mina discovers a camera in the shower head and alerts Charlie; the two are confident Taylor has installed it. Charlie stops her from calling the police, as doing so would likely lead to Michelle and Josh learning they had sex. He also assures her that Taylor would not reveal the footage because it would involve him admitting to spying on them.

That night, Michelle calls Taylor over to fix the hot tub, while Josh realizes his dog has gone missing. Josh is suspicious that Taylor may have taken the dog, so he confronts Taylor upon his arrival, but he denies it. Taylor fixes the hot tub, and Mina privately confronts him about the hidden camera in the shower, which he claims to be unaware of. An argument ensues and Taylor attempts to call the police, but Mina tries to stop him. Hearing the commotion, Josh rushes in and, assuming Taylor was attacking Mina, beats him unconscious. Mina is forced to explain the hidden camera in the shower, but does not reveal that she had sex with Charlie. The group gather in the living room to decide what to do. Meanwhile, a masked man sneaks inside and smothers Taylor to death. When the others return and find Taylor dead, they assume that he died from the injuries inflicted by Josh.

Frantic, Michelle demands they call the police, but Charlie refuses to let his brother, who has previously been incarcerated, return to prison. He suggests that they stage Taylor's death as an accident by throwing him off the cliff into the ocean. Michelle refuses to take part in their plan and goes to the bedroom. Charlie, Josh and Mina carry Taylor's body to the cliff. It falls onto an outcrop, forcing Josh to go down and push it into the sea. Back at the house, Michelle hears the sound of a shower and when she investigates, she is lured into a room where a television shows the footage of Charlie and Mina having sex. Michelle drives over to Charlie, confronts him about what she has seen, and leaves angrily. Down the road, she runs over metal spikes, crashes into a tree and is attacked by the masked man while texting Charlie to come help her.

Charlie gets a text from Michelle's phone and goes to search for her. He finds her dead body on the road and is then attacked and murdered by the masked man. Back at the house, Mina and Josh are looking for the shower camera's transceiver to destroy any footage it recorded. Josh receives texts from Charlie's phone that contain evidence of Charlie and Mina having sex. Josh then hears someone enter the house and, thinking it is Charlie, rushes to confront him. Instead, the masked man ambushes and kills Josh. Mina flees, pursued by the masked man. Sprinting through the forest in the darkness and fog, she accidentally runs off a cliff and falls into the ocean.

The masked man returns to the house, removing all evidence and surveillance equipment. He rents a new property and installs cameras in it. During the credits, footage is shown from the hidden cameras of the masked man attacking a sleeping couple.

Cast
 Dan Stevens as Charlie
 Alison Brie as Michelle
 Sheila Vand as Mina 
 Jeremy Allen White as Josh
 Toby Huss as Taylor

Production
In March 2019, it was announced Alison Brie, Dan Stevens, Sheila Vand and Jeremy Allen White had joined the cast of the film, with Dave Franco directing from a screenplay he wrote alongside Joe Swanberg. Franco, Elizabeth Haggard, Ben Stillman, Teddy Schwarzman, Swanberg and Christopher Storer served as producers on the film, under their Ramona Films and Black Bear Pictures banners, respectively, while Michael Heimler and Sean Durkin acted as executive producers.

Principal photography began on April 22, 2019, lasting through May 24, in Bandon and Portland, Oregon.

Danny Bensi and Saunder Jurriaans composed the film's score, released by Lakeshore Records.

Release
In April 2020, IFC Films acquired distribution rights to the film and scheduled it to be released on July 24, 2020. Due to the COVID-19 pandemic, the film held its premiere at the Vineland Drive-In theatre in City of Industry, California on June 18, 2020.

Reception

Box office and VOD 

The film made an estimated $130,000 from 251 theaters in its first day, and $420,871 over the weekend, topping the box office. It also was the top-rented film on Apple TV, the iTunes Store and other streaming services, becoming just the second film to ever top both the box office and rental charts. In its second weekend the film retained the top spot at the box office, grossing $290,272 from 242 theaters. It also remained in the top 10 at the iTunes Store, Apple TV, and Spectrum's rental charts. In its third weekend the film made $123,700 at the box office and came in fourth, while also remaining the top-rented horror film at iTunes.

Critical response 
The website's critics consensus reads: "Some tricky genre juggling makes The Rental a bit of a fixer-upper, but effective chills and a solid cast make this a fine destination for horror fans." On Metacritic, the film has a weighted average score of 62 out of 100, based on 30 critics, indicating "generally favorable reviews".

Writing for the Chicago Sun-Times, Richard Roeper gave the film three-and-a-half stars out of four, saying: "The Rental would have worked purely as a compelling character study about four dysfunctional adults unraveling over the course of a long weekend — but when the presence of a homicidal maniac is introduced to the proceedings, the transition to horror film is brilliant and wacky and pretty darn great." Owen Gleiberman of Variety said the film had "tense flavor and skill" and wrote: "There's some crafty artistry at work in The Rental, and also some fairly standard pandering, which feels like a violation of the movie's better instincts. That said, most of it is skillful and engrossing enough to establish Franco as a director to watch." In a negative review, Oliver Jones of the Observer said the film’s ideas aren’t fully explored or developed enough, which results in "a tweener: a film that is part infidelity drama and part slasher film while never fully committing to either idea." Jones added the plot felt "paper-thin" and the characters insubstantial, concluding "there are seeds of ideas about the toxicity of aspirational real estate and those that indifferently own it that could have possibly have flowered into something worth exploring."

Potential sequel 
Franco has voiced his interest in a sequel, saying: "It was the intention from the beginning to leave the ending ambiguous enough that we carry on the story if given a chance... I have a very strong idea for what I would want to do with a sequel."

References

External links
 

2020 directorial debut films
2020 films
2020 horror films
2020s psychological horror films
2020s English-language films
American horror thriller films
American psychological horror films
Black Bear Pictures films
Films about couples
Films about security and surveillance
Films about vacationing
Films directed by Dave Franco
Films set in Oregon
Films shot in Oregon
IFC Films films
2020 independent films
2020s American films